Sherman Township is the name of a number of places in the U.S. state of Michigan:

 Sherman Township, Gladwin County, Michigan
 Sherman Township, Huron County, Michigan
 Sherman Township, Iosco County, Michigan
 Sherman Township, Isabella County, Michigan
 Sherman Township, Keweenaw County, Michigan
 Sherman Township, Mason County, Michigan
 Sherman Township, Newaygo County, Michigan
 Sherman Township, Osceola County, Michigan
 Sherman Township, St. Joseph County, Michigan

See also
Sherman Township (disambiguation)

Michigan township disambiguation pages